Leisy is a surname. Notable people with the surname include:

Jim Leisy (born 1950), American artist, photographer, book editor, and publisher
Matt Leisy, British-American actor
Robert Ronald Leisy (1945–1969), United States Army officer